Elena Kampouris (born September 16, 1997) is an American actress. She is known for her roles as Allison Doss in the 2014 drama Men, Women & Children, Maya Decker in the NBC drama series American Odyssey, Paris Miller in the 2016 romantic comedy My Big Fat Greek Wedding 2, and Juliet Sykes in the 2017 drama Before I Fall. In 2016, Kampouris made her Broadway debut in Les Liaisons Dangereuses as Cécile Volanges. Currently, Kampouris stars in the role of Chloe Sampson in the Netflix superhero series Jupiter's Legacy.

Early life
Kampouris was born in New York City, the daughter of Ivey Barry, a fashion illustrator and designer, and Alexander Kampouris, who owns a boutique wine store in Basking Ridge, New Jersey. Her father is Greek, from the island of Kassos, and her mother is American, of English and French descent. Kampouris has one older brother, Emmanuel. She grew up in Bridgewater Township, New Jersey and attended Gill St. Bernard's School, though she left school and was tutored for her final years of high school.

Career
In 2012, Kampouris made her acting debut with a small guest role as a Constance Girl in one episode of The CW teen drama series Gossip Girl. She followed this with the Nickelodeon television comedy film Jinxed (2013), in which she played Ivy Murray. That same year, Kampouris made her film debut in the drama Labor Day, playing a young Rachel McCann. In December 2013, she signed with the William Morris Endeavor talent agency.

In 2014, Kampouris played Allison Doss in the comedy-drama film Men, Women & Children. Later, she portrayed Alexia in the comedy-drama film The Cobbler.

In 2015, she starred in the NBC thriller series American Odyssey as Maya Decker, the daughter of Peter Facinelli's character. The series was cancelled after one season. Kampouris had a supporting role in the romantic comedy film My Big Fat Greek Wedding 2.

In 2016, she made her Broadway debut in a production of Les Liaisons Dangereuses. Kampouris played the supporting role of Cécile Volanges, a wealthy and naive teenager. The following year, she had a supporting role as Juliet Sykes in the drama film Before I Fall.

On February 11, 2019, it was announced that Kampouris was cast as Chloe Sampson in the Netflix superhero series, Jupiter's Legacy.

Filmography

Film

Television

Stage

References

Further reading
"Performer: Elena Kampouris". Internet Broadway Database. Retrieved October 2, 2017.
Nordstrom, Leigh (March 24, 2016). "Growing Up Greek: Elena Kampouris Stars in 'My Big Fat Greek Wedding 2'". Women's Wear Daily.
Sneider, Jeff (May 14, 2015). "'My Big Fat Greek Wedding 2' Adds 'American Odyssey' Star Elena Kampouris (Exclusive)". TheWrap. Retrieved July 29, 2015.
Mandell, Andrea (September 11, 2014). "Toronto Spotlight: Meet Elena Kampouris". USA Today. Retrieved July 29, 2015.
Acosta, Laura. "On The Cusp: Elena Kampouris, Actor". NeimanMarcus.com. Retrieved July 29, 2015.
"Elena Kampouris as Maya Decker". NBC. Retrieved July 29, 2015.
La Gorce, Tammy (August 25, 2016). "Greek Actress Elena Kampouris is True to Her Roots". New Jersey Monthly. Retrieved November 8, 2016.

External links
 
 Elena Kampouris at the Internet Broadway Database

1997 births
21st-century American actresses
Actresses from New Jersey
Actresses from New York City
American people of Greek descent
American people of English descent
American people of French descent
American child actresses
American film actresses
American stage actresses
American television actresses
Gill St. Bernard's School alumni
Living people
People from Bridgewater Township, New Jersey